Kaunas Hockey is an ice hockey team located in Kaunas, Lithuania, which plays in the Lithuania Hockey League, the top tier of ice hockey in Lithuania. They play home games at the Kaunas Ice Arena.

History
Hockey Kaunas was founded in 2017, with the purpose of helping to improve the standard of Lithuanian hockey with the ultimate goal of seeing the Lithuanian national team compete in the Winter Olympics. One of the teams initial investors was TeleSoftas, a Kaunas-based software company. Following their formation, Hockey Kaunas immediately began play in the Lithuania Hockey League. Their first season was a productive one, making it to the playoff finals, before ultimately losing to SC Energija.

In 2020 Kaunas Hockey took part in the inaugural Baltic Hockey League, a competition made up of two teams from each of Estonia, Latvia and Lithuania. The team finished last in their group after suffering heavy losses against both Tartu Välk 949 of Estonia, and Latvian side HK Mogo. As a result, they did not progress to the final round. In addition, as a result of being in first place of the NLRL when the remainder of games were cancelled due to the COVID-19 pandemic, Kaunas Hockey also qualified for the 2020–21 IIHF Continental Cup where they were scheduled to face-off against Skautafelag Akureyrar of Iceland, Israeli team HC Bat Yam and Spanish outfit FC Barcelona. However, two months later, the IIHF cancelled the Continental Cup due to the Pandemic.

Roster
Updated January 24, 2021.

Season-by-season record
Note: GP = Games played, W = Wins, L = Losses, T = Ties, OTL = Overtime losses, Pts = Points, GF = Goals for, GA = Goals against, PIM = Penalties in minutes

Team records

Career
These are the top five scorers in Kaunas Hockey history.

''Note: Pos = Position; GP = Games played; G = Goals; A = Assists; Pts = Points

Penalty minutes: Vasilijus Fedotovas, 135

Season

Regular season 
 Most goals in a season: Eduard Chekmaryov, 27 (2019–20)
 Most assists in a season: Lukas Zukauskas, 24 (2019–20)
 Most points in a season: Eduard Chekmaryov, 50 (2019–20)
 Most penalty minutes in a season: Jon Stephansson, 90 (2018–19)

Playoffs 
 Most goals in a playoff season: Eduard Chekmaryov, 9 (2019–20)
 Most assists in a playoff season: Lukas Zukauskas, 7 (2019–20)
 Most points in a playoff season: Eduard Chekmaryov, 14 (2019–20)
 Most penalty minutes in a playoff season: Vasilijus Fedotovas, 10 (2019–20)

References

External links
 

Sport in Kaunas
Ice hockey teams in Lithuania
Lithuanian Hockey League teams
Ice hockey clubs established in 2017
2017 establishments in Lithuania